The Interurban (or radial railway in Europe and Canada) is a type of electric railway, with streetcar-like electric self-propelled rail cars which run within and between cities or towns. They were very prevalent in North America between 1900 and 1925 and were used primarily for passenger travel between cities and their surrounding suburban and rural communities. The concept spread to countries such as Japan, the Netherlands, Switzerland, Belgium, Italy and Poland.  Interurban as a term encompassed the companies, their infrastructure, their cars that ran on the rails, and their service. In the United States, the early 1900s interurban was a valuable economic institution. Most roads between towns and many town streets were unpaved. Transportation and haulage was by horse-drawn carriages and carts. The interurban provided reliable transportation, particularly in winter weather, between the town and countryside. In 1915,  of interurban railways were operating in the United States and, for a few years, interurban railways, including the numerous manufacturers of cars and equipment, were the fifth-largest industry in the country. By 1930, most interurbans in North America were gone with a few surviving into the 1950s.

Outside of the US large networks of high-speed electric tramways have been built in countries across the world that survive today. Notable systems exist in the Low Countries, Poland and Japan, where populations are densely packed around large conurbations such as the Randstad, Upper Silesia, Greater Tokyo Area and Keihanshin. Switzerland, particularly, has a large network of mountain narrow gauge interurban lines.

In addition, many tram-train lines are being built, especially in France and Germany but also elsewhere in the world. These can be regarded as interurbans since they run on the streets, like trams, when in cities, while out of them they either share existing railway lines or put lines abandoned by the railway companies to a new use.

Definition 

The term "interurban" was coined by Charles L. Henry, a state senator in Indiana. The Latin, inter urbes, means "between cities". The interurban fit on a continuum between urban street railways and full-fledged railroads. George W. Hilton and John F. Due identified four characteristics of an interurban:

 Electric power for propulsion.
 Passenger service as the primary business.
 Equipment heavier and faster than urban streetcars.
 Operation on tracks in city streets, and in rural areas on roadside tracks or private rights-of-way.

The definition of "interurban" is necessarily blurry. Some town streetcar lines evolved into interurban systems by extending streetcar track from town into the countryside to link adjacent towns together and sometimes by the acquisition of a nearby interurban system. There was a large amount of consolidation of lines following initial construction. Other interurban lines effectively became light rail systems with no street running whatsoever, or they became primarily freight-hauling railroads because of a progressive loss of their initial passenger service over the years.

In 1905, the United States Census Bureau defined an interurban as "a street railway having more than half its trackage outside municipal limits." It drew a distinction between "interurban" and "suburban" railroads. A suburban system was oriented toward a city center in a single urban area and served commuter traffic. A regular railroad moved riders from one city center to another city center and also moved a substantial amount of freight. The typical interurban similarly served more than one city, but it served a smaller region and made more frequent stops, and it was oriented to passenger rather than freight service.

History

Emergence

The development of interurbans in the late nineteenth century resulted from the convergence of two trends: improvements in electric traction, and an untapped demand for transportation in rural areas, particularly in the Midwestern United States. The 1880s saw the first successful deployments of electric traction in streetcar systems. Most of these built on the pioneering work of Frank J. Sprague, who developed an improved method for mounting an electric traction motor and using a trolley pole for pickup. Sprague's work led to widespread acceptance of electric traction for streetcar operations and end of horse-drawn trams.

The late nineteenth-century United States witnessed a boom in agriculture which lasted through the First World War, but transportation in rural areas was inadequate. Conventional steam railroads made limited stops, mostly in towns. These were supplemented by horse and buggies and steamboats, both of which were slow and the latter of which was restricted to navigable rivers. The increased capacity and profitability of the city street railroads offered the possibility of extending them into the countryside to reach new markets, even linking to other towns. The first interurban to emerge in the United States was the Newark and Granville Street Railway in Ohio, which opened in 1889. It was not a major success, but others followed. The development of the automobile was then in its infancy, and to many investors interurbans appeared to be the future of local transportation.

Growth

From 1900 to 1916, large networks of interurban lines was constructed across the United States, particularly in the states of Indiana, Ohio, Pennsylvania, Illinois, Iowa, Utah, and California. At one point in time beginning in 1901, it was possible to travel from Elkhart Lake, Wisconsin to Little Falls, New York exclusively by interurban. During this expansion, in the regions where they operated, particularly in Ohio and Indiana,  "...they almost destroyed the local passenger service of the steam railroad." To show how exceptionally busy the interurbans radiating from Indianapolis were in 1926, the immense Indianapolis Traction Terminal (nine roof covered tracks and loading platforms) scheduled 500 trains in and out daily and moved 7 million passengers that year. At their peak the interurbans were the fifth-largest industry in the United States.

In Belgium, a sprawling, nation-wide system of narrow-gauge vicinal tramways have been built by the NMVB / SNCV to provide transport to smaller towns across the country with the first section opening in 1885. These lines were either electrically operated or run with diesel tramcars, included numerous street-running sections, and inter-operated with local tram networks in the larger cities. Similar to Belgium, a large network of interurbans was constructed in the Netherlands in the early 1900s called streektramlijnen.

A large network of interurbans started developing around Milan in the late 1800s, which started as horse and later steam trams. These initial interurban lines were gradually upgraded with electric traction in the early 1900s with some assistance from Thomas Edison. By the 1930s a vast network of interurbans connected Milan with surrounding towns. 

The first interurban railway in Japan is the Hanshin Electric Railway, built to compete with mainline steam trains on the Osaka to Kobe corridor and completed in 1905. As laws of that time did not allow parallel railways to be built, the line was legally defined as a tramway and included street running at the two ends, but was based on American interurbans and operated with large tramcars on mostly private right-of-way. In the same year, the Keihin Express Railway, or Keikyu, completed a section of what is today part of the Keikyū Main Line between Shinagawa, Tokyo and Kanagawa, Yokohama. This line competes with mainline Japanese National Railways on this busy corridor. Predecessors of the Meitetsu opened their first interurban lines in 1912, what today form parts of the Meitetsu Inuyama Line and Tsushima Line. In 1913, the first section of what will become the Keiō Line opened connecting Chōfu to just outside Shinjuku with street running on what is today the Kōshū Kaidō or National Route 20. Kyushu Electric Railroad, predecessor to Nishitetsu opened its first interurban line in 1914 serving Kitakyushu and surrounding areas, taking heavy inspiration from Hanshin Electric Railway.

In the first half of the 20th century, an extensive interurban network covered Northern England, centered on South Lancashire and West Yorkshire.

Diverging fortunes

Decline in North America 

The fortunes of the industry in The US and Canada declined during World War I, particularly into the early 1920s. In 1919 President Woodrow Wilson created the Federal Electric Railways Commission to investigate the financial problems of the industry. The commission submitted its final report to the President in 1920. The commission's report focused on financial management problems and external economic pressures on the industry, and recommended against introducing public financing for the interurban industry. One of the commission's consultants, however, published an independent report stating that private ownership of electric railways had been a failure, and only public ownership would keep the interurbans in business.

Many interurbans had been hastily constructed without realistic projections of income and expenses. They were initially financed by issuing stock and selling bonds. The sale of these financial instruments was often local with salesmen going door to door aggressively pushing this new and exciting "it can't fail" form of transportation. But many of those interurbans did fail, and often quickly. They had poor cash flow from the outset and struggled to raise essential further capital. Interurbans were very vulnerable to acts of nature damaging track and bridges, particularly in the Midwestern United States where flooding was common. Receivership was a common fate when the interurban company could not pay its payroll and other debts, so state courts took over and allowed continued operation while suspending the company's obligation to pay interest on its bonds. In addition, the interurban honeymoon period with the municipalities of 1895–1910 was over. The large and heavy interurbans, some weighing as much as 65 tons, caused damage to city streets which led to endless disputes over who should bear the repair costs. The rise of automobile traffic in the middle 1920s aggravated those trends. As the interurban companies struggled financially they faced rising competition from cars and trucks on newly paved streets and highways, while municipalities sought to alleviate traffic congestion by removing interurbans from city streets. Some companies exited the passenger business altogether to focus on freight, while others sought to buttress their finances by selling surplus electricity in local communities. Several interurbans which attempted to exit the rail business altogether ran afoul of state commissions which required that trains remain running "for the public good," even at a loss.

Many financially weak interurbans did not survive the prosperous 1920s, and most others went bankrupt during the Great Depression. A few struggling lines tried combining to form much larger systems in an attempt to gain operating efficiency and a broader customer base. This occurred in Ohio in year 1930 with the long Cincinnati & Lake Erie Railroad (C&LE), and in Indiana with the very widespread Indiana Railroad. Both had limited success up to 1937–1938 primarily from growing revenues earned from freight.

Oliver Jensen, author of American Heritage History of Railroads in America, commented that "...the automobile doomed the interurban whose private tax paying tracks could never compete with the highways that a generous government provided for the motorist." William D. Middleton in the opening of his classic 270 page book "The Interurban Era" said: "Evolved from the urban streetcar, the Interurban appeared shortly before the dawn of the 20th century, grew to a vast network of over 18,000 miles in two decades of excellent growth, and then all but vanished after barely three decades of usefulness."

Interurban business increased for the survivors during World War II due to fuel oil rationing and large wartime employment. When the war ended in 1945, riders went back to their automobiles, and most of these lines were finally abandoned. Several systems struggled into the 1950s, including the Baltimore and Annapolis Railroad (passenger service ended 1950), Lehigh Valley Transit Company (1951), West Penn Railways (1952), and the Illinois Terminal Railroad (1958). The West Penn was the largest interurban to operate in the east at 339 miles and had provided Pittsburgh area coal country towns hourly transportation since 1888.

By the 1960s there were only five remaining interurban lines serving commuters in three major metropolitan areas: the North Shore Line and the South Shore Line in Chicago, the Philadelphia Suburban Transportation Company, the New York, Susquehanna and Western Railway in northern New Jersey and the Long Beach Line in Long Beach and Los Angeles (the last remaining part of the Pacific Electric system). The Long Beach Line was cut in 1961, the North Shore Line in 1963; the Philadelphia Suburban's route 103 and the NYS&W in New Jersey both ended passenger service in 1966. The South Shore Line was left as the only survivor. Some former interurban lines retained freight service for up to several decades after the discontinuance of passenger service. Most were converted to diesel operation, although the Sacramento Northern Railway retained electric freight until 1965.

Consolidation in Europe 
After World War II many interurbans outside of the US also started to be cut back. In Belgium, as intercity transport shifted to cars and buses, the large sections of the vicinal tramways were gradually shut down by the 1980s.  At their peak in 1945, the mileage of vicinal tramways reached 4,811 kilometres and exceeded the length of the national railway network.Sprawling tram networks in the Netherlands have been extended to neighbouring cities. The vast majority of these interurban lines were not electrified and operated with steam and sometimes petrol or diesel tramcars. Many did not survive the 1920s and 30s for the same reasons American interurbans went bust, but those that did were put back into service during the war years, or at least the remaining parts not yet demolished. One of the largest systems, nicknamed the Blue Tram, was run by the Noord-Zuid-Hollandsche Stoomtramweg-Maatschappij and survived until 1961. Another, the RTM (Rotterdamse Tramweg Maatschappij), which ran in the river delta south-west of Rotterdam, survived until early January 1966 and its demise sparked the rail-related heritage movement in the Netherlands in earnest with the founding of the Tramweg Stichting (Tramway Foundation). Many systems such as the Hague tramway and the Rotterdam tramway also included long interurban extensions which were operated with larger, higher-speed cars. In close parallel to North America, many interurban systems were abandoned from the 1950s after tram companies switched to buses. Instigated by the oil crisis in the 1970s, the remaining interurban tramways have enjoyed somewhat of a renaissance in the form of the Sneltram, a modern light rail system that uses high floor, metro-style vehicles and could interoperate into metro networks. Various other interurbans in Europe were folded into local municipal tramway or light rail systems. Switzerland retained many of its interurban lines which now operate as tramways, local railways, S-Bahn, or tram-trains. Milan's vast interurban network was progressively closed in the 1970s but parts of it were reused as the outer parts of the Milan Metro.

Evolution in Japan 
Development of Japanese interurbans strayed from their American counterparts from the 1920s, after which motorisation did not develop as quickly as in North America. The second boom of interurbans occurred as late as the 1920s and 30s in Japan, with predecessors of the extensive Kintetsu Railway, Hankyu, Nankai Electric Railway and Odakyu Electric Railway networks starting life during this period. These interurbans, built with straighter tracks, electrified at 1500V and operated using larger tramcars, were built to even higher standards than the Japanese National Railways network at the time. The (former JNR) Hanwa Line was a wartime acquisition from Nankai, operating 'Super Express' trains on the line at an average speed of 81.6 km/h, a national record at the time. The old Sendai station terminus of the Miyagi Electric Railway (the predecessor of the JR Senseki Line) was situated in a short single-track underground tunnel built in 1925; this was the first stretch of underground railway in all of Asia, predating the Tokyo Metro Ginza Line by two years.

After the war, interurbans and other private railway companies were given large amounts of investment and allowed to compete not only with mainline trains but also with each other, in order to rejuvenate the country's railway infrastructure and cater for the post-war baby boom. Lines were reconstructed to allow higher speeds, mainline-sized trains were adopted, street-running sections were rebuilt to elevated or underground rights-of-way, and link lines to growing metro systems were built to allow for through operations. Many of these private railway companies started to construct lines using standards similar to the national rail network, and, like JR commuter routes, are operated as 'metro-style' commuter railways with mainline-sized vehicles and metro-like frequencies of very few minutes.  In 1957, the Odakyu Electric Railway introduced the Odakyu 3000 series SE, the first in a line of luxurious tourist Limited Express trains named 'Romancecars'. This series' design was based on the Chicago North Shore and Milwaukee Railroad's Electroliner units, complete with Jacobs bogies which are rarity in Japan. These units set the narrow-gauge speed record of 145 km/h on its runs to a mountain spa resort.

The handful of Japanese National Railways acquisitions of interurban railways – including the Hanwa Line, Senseki Line and the Iida Line – remain outliers on the national network, with short station distances, (in the case of the Iida Line) lower-grade infrastructure, and independent termini (such as Aobadori Station and the upper level of the Tennōji Station).Today, trackage of the major sixteen private railways, initially designed as American-style interurban railways, has been upgraded beyond recognition to high capacity urban heavy railways.  However, numerous operational characteristics of interurbans are preserved to this day, in the form of inter-operation with city center local railways (in this case, through services to metro lines), wide varieties of stopping patterns (including premium services), and stations that are often in close proximity to each other. Multinational department store chains are still operated by private railway companies that started out as interurbans such as Tokyu, Seibu, Odakyu, Hankyu and Tobu at their city termini; these form only a small part of their extensive business empires, which often include real estate, hotels and resorts, tourist attractions, stadiums and smaller rail subsidiaries in addition to their interurban networks upgraded to high capacity urban railway operations. For example, the Keikyu network has changed unrecognizably from its early days, operating Limited Express services at up to 120 km/h to compete with JR trains, and inter-operating with subway and Keisei Electric Railway trains on through runs extending up to 200 km; the trains retain a red livery based on the Pacific Electric's 'Red Cars', true to the company's interurban roots. The Keiō Line did not fully remove the streetrunning section on the Kōshū Kaidō outside of Shinjuku Station until the 1960s, replacing it with an underground section.

Similar to passenger railway conditions in early 1900s America, intense competition still exists today between private railways and mainline railways operated by the Japan Railways Group along highly congested corridors is a hallmark of suburban railway operations in Japan. For example, on the Osaka to Kobe corridor, JR West competes intensely with both Hankyu Kobe Line and Hanshin Main Line trains in terms of speed, convenience and comfort. 

However, a number of interurbans in Japan did close down up into the 2000s, with networks in Kitakyushu and Gifu being shut down.

Today

Austria
Between Vienna and Baden bei Wien the Badner Bahn, operates a classic interurban passenger service, in addition to some freight services. Some interurban lines survive today a local railways in Upper Austria are such as the Linzer Lokalbahn, Lokalbahn Vöcklamarkt–Attersee and Lokalbahn Lambach–Vorchdorf-Eggenberg. While others operate as extension of a local city tramway such as the Traunseebahn which is now connected to the Gmunden Tramway.

Belgium 

Today, two surviving interurban networks descending from the vicinal tramways exist in Belgium. The famous Belgian Coast Tram, built in 1885, traverses the entire Belgian coastline and, at a length of 68 km (42 miles), which is the longest tram line in the world. The Charleroi Metro is a never fully completed pre-metro network upgraded and developed from the dense vicinal tramway network around the city.

Canada 
Similar to United States, most passenger interurbans in Canada were removed by the 1950s. One example of continuous passenger service still exists today, the Toronto Transit Commission 501 Queen streetcar line. The western segment of the 501 Streetcar operates largely on what was the T&YRR Port Credit Radial Line, a radial line that remains intact through the Borough of Etobicoke and up to the border of the neighboring City of Mississauga, unlike other Toronto radial lines which all have been abandoned outside of the Borough of Old Toronto.

Germany
In Germany various networks have continued to exist. The most famous example of this is Karlsruhe, revitalized the interurban concept into the Karlsruhe model by renovating two local railways Alb Valley Railway which already had interoperation with local tram trackage and the Hardt Railway. Other examples include:

 Interurban tram routes serving Mannheim, Heidelberg, Weinheim (Route 5) and Bad Dürkheim (Route 4) as part of the Mannheim/Ludwigshafen Tram System.
 Various interurbans upgraded as part of the Rhine-Ruhr Stadtbahn system such as Düsseldorf to Krefeld (U76) and Duisburg (U79), Bochum/Gelsenkirchen (Route 302), Mülheim to Essen and Essen to Gelsenkirchen (Route 107).
 interurban route between Cologne to Bonn (Route 16)

Italy 
Milan operates one remaining interurban tramway to Limbiate with another interurban route to Carate Brianza/Giussano suspended since 2011. These two lines were once part of large network of interurbans surrounding Milan that were gradually closed in the 1970s.

Japan 

In Japan, the vast majority of the major sixteen private railways have roots as interurban electric railway lines that have taken inspirations from the US. Instead of demolishing their trackage in the 1930s like the United States, many Japanese interurbans companies upgraded their networks to heavy rail standards becoming today's large private railways.  To this day, private railway companies in Japan remain as highly influential business empires with diverse business interests, encompassing department stores, property developments and even tourist resorts. Many Japanese private railway companies compete with each other for passengers, operate department stores at their city termini, develop suburban properties adjacent to stations they own, and run special tourist attractions with admission included in package deals with rail tickets; similar to operations of large interurban companies in the US during their heyday.

While most interurbans in Japan have been upgraded beyond recognition to high capacity urban railways, a handful have remained relatively untouched, with street running and using with 'lighter-rail' stock in short consists, retaining a distinct character similar to classic American interurbans to this day. These include:
The Keihan Keishin Line, operating between Kyoto and Otsu, with through services to a Tozai Line on the Kyoto side and street running on the Otsu side. Originally was entirely streetrunning into Kyoto but was partly replaced by the opening of the Tozai Subway Line which trains through operate into.
The Keihan Ishiyama Sakamoto Line a primary north south line operating in Otsu with some street running sections in the city center where it connects with the Keishin Line. 
The Eizan Electric Railway originally an interurban that once through operated into the Kyoto City Tram network but was isolated after the closure of the Kyoto City Tram. To this day operates light, one or two car consists. 
 The Enoshima Electric Railway, which is a 10-km line with elevated and on-street trackage, and operated with light, two-car articulated trains.
 The Fukui Railway Fukubu Line, which operates a variety of express and local services using light rail cars acquired from Nagoya Railroad's defunct interurban network in Gifu, over a line with an extended on-street section.
 The Kumamoto Electric Railway, which operates ex-Tokyo subway stock on a line which includes a short on-street section.
 The Chikuhō Electric Railroad Line still operates articulated tramcars on private right-of-way, a holdover from its former inter-operation with the defunct Nishitetsu Kitakyushu street tram network.

Netherlands 

The only surviving interurban line is also the oldest regional tramway in the Netherlands a line from The Hague to Delft. Which opened as horse-tramway in 1866. Nowadays the line operates as Line 1 of The Hague Tramway. 
Line E, run by Randstadrail, was an interurban line connecting Rotterdam to The Hague and in the past also to Scheveningen. It now interoperates with the Rotterdam Metro.

Poland

A large interurban network called the Silesian Interurbans still exists today connecting the urban areas of the Upper Silesia. It is one of the largest interurban networks in Europe.

United States 

Only three continuously operating passenger interurbans in the US remain with most being abandoned by the 1950s.

The South Shore Line is now owned by the state of Indiana and uses mainline-sized electric multiple units. Its last section of street running, in Michigan City, Indiana, was finally closed in 2022 for conversion to a grade-separated double-track line.

SEPTA operates three former Philadelphia Suburban lines: the Norristown High Speed Line as an interurban heavy rail line, and Route 101 and 102 as light rail lines.

In Chicago the Skokie Valley portion of the North Shore Line from Dempster Street to Howard Street was acquired by the Chicago Transit Authority and is now the Yellow Line. The Yellow Line initially operated with third rail from Howard Street to the Skokie Shops and switched to overhead wire for the remainder of the journey to Dempster Street, until 2004 when the overhead wire was replaced with third rail.

Several former interurban rights of way have been reused for modern light rail lines, including the Los Angeles Metro A and E Lines and one section of the Baltimore Light Rail. Several museums and heritage railways, including the Western Railway Museum and Seashore Trolley Museum, operate restored equipment on former interurban lines.  The Iowa Traction Railway still operates freight service today using interurban equipment and infrastructure. The River Line in New Jersey is also considered an interurban.

Switzerland

Switzerland operated a huge number of interurbans which today many have been upgraded into a number of different modes with a few remaining interurban features left. Several still have interurban characteristics such as unprotected alignments next to the road right of ways and/or street running. Today former interurban lines have been upgraded to operate as:

 Extensions of local tram system such as Bern Tramway Line 6 to Worb and Baselland Transport Line 10 formed from combining two narrow-gauge interurbans.
 Local private railway networks such as Aargau Verkehr, Aare Seeland mobil, Transports Publics du Chablais, Rhaetian Railway, Chemins de fer du Jura or as individual railways like the Lausanne–Bercher line and Waldenburg railway. These lines commonly retain some street running sections and unprotected roadside alignments.
 Tram-trains such as the Forch railway which is part of the Zürich S-Bahn operating on the Zürich Tram System in the city center or the St. Gallen–Trogen and Frauenfeld–Wil railways as part of the St. Gallen S-Bahn.

Infrastructure and design

Right of way 

Interurbans typically ran along or on a public right-of-way. In towns, interurbans ran in the street, sharing track with existing street railroads. While street running limited acquisition costs, it also required sharp turns and made interurban operations susceptible to traffic congestion. Unlike conventional railroads, it was rare for an interurban to construct long unencumbered stretches of private right-of-way. The torque characteristics of electric operation allowed interurbans to operate on steeper grades than conventional steam locomotives.

Trackage

Compared to conventional steam railroad trackage, interurban rail was light and ballasted lightly, if at all. Most interurbans in North America were built to standard gauge, but there were exceptions. In Europe narrow-gauge interurbans were more common. In Japan the national mainlines were built to  narrow gauge however due to influence from for US interurban operations the first interurban companies in Japan built trackage to standard gauge. This remains the case today with Keikyu and Hanshin, forerunners of Japan's interurbans, still using standard gauge today. Later companies regauged or outright built lines to  narrow gauge for better intercompatibility and consistency with the Japanese mainline standards. Interurbans often used the tracks of existing street railways through city and town streets, and if these street railways were not built to standard, the interurbans had to use the non-standard gauges as well or face the expense of building their own separate trackage through urban areas. Some municipalities deliberately mandated non-standard gauges to prevent freight operations on public streets. In Los Angeles, the Pacific Electric Railway, using standard  gauge track, and the Los Angeles Railway, the city's streetcar system, using  narrow gauge, shared dual-gauge track in downtown Los Angeles with one rail common to each.

Electrification 

Most interurban railways in North America were constructed using the same low-voltage 500 to 600 V DC trolley power in use by the street railways to which they connected. This enabled interurban cars to use the same overhead trolley power on town street car tracks with no electrical change on the cars to accommodate a different voltage. However, higher voltages became necessary to reduce power loss on long-distance transmission lines and routes, though substations were established to boost voltage. In 1905 Westinghouse introduced a 6600 V 25 Hz alternating current (AC) system which a number of railroads adopted. This required fewer substations than DC, but came with higher maintenance costs. The necessary on-board 6600 AC voltage reduction plus AC to DC rectification on each powered car to run DC traction motors added to greater car construction expense plus the operational dangers that such on-board high voltages created.

More common were high-voltage DC systems – usually 1200 V DC, introduced in 1908 by Indianapolis & Louisville Traction Company for their Dixie Flyer and Hoosier Flyer services. In the streets, where high-speed service was not feasible, the cars ran at half speed at 600 V or got a voltage changeover device. such as on the Sacramento Northern. A 2400 V DC third-rail system was installed on the Michigan United Railways's Western Division between Kalamazoo and Grand Rapids in 1915, but was abandoned because of the electrocution potential safety hazard. Even 5000 V DC was tested.

Most interurban cars and freight locomotives collected current from an overhead trolley wire. The cars contacted this wire through the use of a trolley pole or a pantograph. Other designs collected current from a third rail. Some interurbans used both: in open country, the third rail was used and in town, a trolley pole was raised. An example of this was the Chicago, Aurora, and Elgin Railroad where a trolley pole was used in both Aurora and Elgin, Illinois. Third rail was cheaper to maintain and more conductive, but it was more expensive to construct initially and it did not eliminate the need for AC transformers, AC transmission lines, and AC/DC conversion systems. In addition, third rail posed a serious danger to trespassers and animals and was difficult to keep clear of ice.

Trains and equipment

Rolling stock 

These featured the classic arch-window look with truss-rods and cow-catchers. Three of the best known early companies were Jewett, Niles, and Kuhlman, all of Ohio. These interurbans required a two men crew, an operator and a conductor. As competition increased for passengers and costs needed to be reduced in the 1920s, interurban companies and manufacturers attempted to reduce car weight and wind resistance in order to reduce power consumption. The new designs also required only a one-man crew with the operator collecting tickets and making change. The trucks were improved to provide a better ride, acceleration, and top speed but with reduced power consumption. Into the 1930s, better quality and lighter steel and aluminum use reduced weight, and cars were redesigned to ride lower in order to reduce wind resistance. Car design peaked in the early 1930s with the light weight Cincinnati Car Company-built Red Devil cars of the Cincinnati and Lake Erie Railroad.

In addition to passenger cars, interurban companies acquired freight locomotives and line maintenance equipment.  A "box motor"  was a powered car exclusive for freight that looked like a passenger interurban without windows and had wide side doors for loading freight. A freight motor was geared for power rather than speed and could pull up to six freight cars depending upon the load and grades. Freight cars for interurbans tended to be smaller than those for steam railroads, and they had to have special extended couplers to prevent car corner contact at the very tight grinding turns at city street corners. Maintenance equipment included "line cars" with roof platforms for the trolley wire repair crew, snow plows and snow sweepers with rotating brushes, a car for weed control and to maintain track and ballast. In order to save money, many companies constructed these in their shops using retired or semi-wrecked passenger cars for the frame and the traction motor mounted trucks.

Passenger trains 

Passenger interurban service grew out of horse-drawn rail cars operating on city streets. As these routes electrified and extended outside of towns interurbans began to compete with steam railroads for intercity traffic. Interurbans offered more frequent service than steam railroads, with headways of up to one hour or even half an hour. As interurban routes tended to be single-track this led to extensive use of passing sidings. Single interurban cars would operate with a motorman and conductor, although in later years one-man operation was common. In towns with the middle of the street operation, speeds were slow and dictated by local ordinance. The result was that the average speed of a scheduled trip was low, as much as under .

Freight trains 
Many interurbans did substantial freight business. In 1926, the Cincinnati, Hamilton and Dayton Railway moved  of freight per month. During the 1920s freight revenue helped offset the loss of passenger business to automobiles. A typical interurban freight train consisted of a powered box motor pulling one to four freight cars. These often operated at night as local ordinances forbade daytime freight operation on city streets. Interurban freight in the Midwest was so extensive that Indianapolis constructed a very large freight handling warehouse which all of Indianapolis' seven interurbans companies used.

In literature 
In Raymond Chandler's short story The Man who liked Dogs, the narrator trails a suspect in the Los Angeles area:
Carolina Street was away off at the edge of the little beach city. The end of it ran into a disused inter-urban right of way, beyond which stretched a waste of Japanese truck farms. There were just two house in the last block ... the rails were rusted in a forest of weeds.

Similarly in Mandarin's Jade:
The Hotel Tremaine was far out of Santa Monica, near the junk yards. An inter-urban right of way split the street in half, and just as I got to the block that would have the number I had looked up, a two-car train came racketing by at forty-five miles an hour, making almost as much noise as a transport plane taking off. I speeded up beside it and passed the block.

In E.L. Doctorow's Ragtime, a character rides on interurban systems from New York to Boston.

Preservation
Numerous museums, heritage railways and societies have preserved equipment:

 California State Railroad Museum
 Connecticut Trolley Museum
 East Troy Electric Railroad Museum
 Electric City Trolley Museum
 Fox River Trolley Museum
 Fraser Valley Historical Railway Society
 Halton County Radial Railway
 Illinois Railway Museum
 National Museum of Transportation
 Orange Empire Railway Museum
 Oregon Electric Railway Museum
 Rockhill Trolley Museum
 Seashore Trolley Museum
 Shelburne Falls Trolley Museum
 Shore Line Trolley Museum
 Vancouver Downtown Historic Railway
 Western Railway Museum

See also
 List of interurbans
 Streetcar suburb
 Rapid transit
 Interurban Press
 Light rail, a contemporary successor to interurbans
 Tram-train, a similar concept with streetcars sharing mainline intercity tracks for interurban sections
 Elektrichka, a similar system in Russia and post-Soviet states

Notes

References

Further reading

External links
 Central Electric Railfans Association
 Pacific Electric Railway Historical Society
 East Penn Traction Association

 
1900s in rail transport
1910s in rail transport
1920s in rail transport
1920s in the United States
1910s in the United States
1900s in the United States

fi:Kiskobussi